Matsue City General Gymnasium is an arena in Matsue, Shimane, Japan. It is the home arena of the Shimane Susanoo Magic of the B.League, Japan's professional basketball league.

Facilities
Maun arena - 2,747m（67m×41m×16m）
Sub arena - 1,394m（41m×34m×13m）

References

Basketball venues in Japan
Indoor arenas in Japan
Shimane Susanoo Magic
Sports venues in Shimane Prefecture
Sports venues completed in 2016
2016 establishments in Japan